
This is a list of the National Register of Historic Places listings in Niagara Falls, New York.

This is intended to be a complete list of the properties and districts on the National Register of Historic Places in Niagara Falls, New York, United States. The locations of National Register properties and districts for which the latitude and longitude coordinates are included below may be seen in a map.

There are 97 properties and districts listed on the National Register in Niagara County. The city of Niagara Falls is the location of 36 of these properties and districts; they are listed here, while the other properties and districts are listed separately. One additional property in the city was formerly listed but has been removed. Two of these sites, the Adams Power Plant Transformer House and the Niagara Reservation, are further designated as National Historic Landmarks.



Current listings

|}

Former listings

|}

See also

National Register of Historic Places listings in New York

References

Niagara Falls
National Register of Historic Places in Niagara County, New York